Albert J. Gebert (July 30, 1906 – December 4, 1980) was an American football player and coach.  He served as the 16th head football coach at the University of Wichita—now known Wichita State University—in Wichita, Kansas and he held that position for 12 seasons, from 1930 until 1941.
His record at Wichita was 68–40–6.

A native of Jacksonville, Illinois, Gebert attended Routt Catholic High School.  He played football at the University of Notre Dame under coaching great Knute Rockne and was one of the first coaches to gather upon the announcement of his death.  He was named one of Rockne's "Notre Dame All Stars" and played in the final game that Rockne was head coach.

Head coaching record

References

External links

1906 births
1980 deaths
American football quarterbacks
Notre Dame Fighting Irish football players
Wichita State Shockers athletic directors
Wichita State Shockers football coaches
Sportspeople from Jacksonville, Illinois
Coaches of American football from Illinois
Players of American football from Illinois